This list of historical cuisines lists cuisines from recent and ancient history by continent. Current cuisine is the subject of other articles.

Africa
 Ancient Egyptian cuisine

Americas

 Native American cuisine
 Aztec cuisine
 Maya cuisine
 Inca cuisine
 Muisca cuisine
 Cuisine of the Thirteen Colonies
 Cuisine of Antebellum America
 History of Argentine cuisine

Asia

 Iranian cuisine
 Ancient Israelite cuisine
 Byzantine cuisine
 Hittite cuisine
 History of Chinese cuisine
 History of Indian cuisine
 Origins of North Indian and Pakistani foods
 Ottoman cuisine

Europe

 Ancient Greek cuisine
 Ancient Roman cuisine
 Medieval cuisine
 Early modern European cuisine
 Soviet cuisine

See also
 Food history
 List of ancient dishes
 Paleolithic diet
 Timeline of food

References

Cuisine

Historical Cuisines
Cuisine